Romilly Lunge (1904–1994) was a British film actor. He made a total of 15 films and appeared in many stage plays between 1933 and 1940. When war broke out Lunge joined the Royal Navy, ending up in Ceylon working on sonar detection. On one occasion he ended up briefing the future Prince Philip, Duke of Edinburgh on a secret research and development project. After the war he retired from acting and ran a farm in north Warwickshire. He died in August 1994 in Leicestershire, England.

Filmography
 The Perfect Flaw (1934)
 Road House (1934)
 The Dictator (1935)
 The Clairvoyant (1935)
 Koenigsmark (1935)
 His Lordship (1936)
 Annie Laurie (1936)
 A Woman Alone (1936)
 While Parents Sleep (1936)
 For Valour (1937)
 A Royal Divorce (1938)
 Sidewalks of London (1938)
 The Mind of Mr. Reeder (1939)
 Traitor Spy (1939)
 The Door with Seven Locks (1940)

Bibliography
 Low, Rachael. ''History of the British Film: Filmmaking in 1930s Britain. George Allen & Unwin, 1985 .

References

External links

1904 births
1994 deaths
English male film actors
Male actors from London
20th-century English male actors